In probability theory and statistics, the noncentral F-distribution is a continuous  probability distribution that is a noncentral generalization of the (ordinary) F-distribution. It describes the distribution of the quotient (X/n1)/(Y/n2), where the numerator X has a noncentral chi-squared distribution with n1 degrees of freedom and the denominator Y has a central chi-squared distribution with n2 degrees of freedom. It is also required that X and Y are statistically independent of each other.

It is the distribution of the test statistic in analysis of variance problems when the null hypothesis is false.  The noncentral F-distribution is used to find the power function of such a test.

Occurrence and specification 

is a noncentral F-distributed random variable.
The probability density function (pdf) for the noncentral F-distribution is

when  and zero otherwise.
The term  is the beta function, where

The cumulative distribution function for the noncentral F-distribution is

where  is the regularized incomplete beta function.

The mean and variance of the noncentral F-distribution are

and

Special cases 
When λ = 0, the noncentral F-distribution becomes the
F-distribution.

Related distributions 
Z has a noncentral chi-squared distribution if

 

where F has a noncentral F-distribution.

See also noncentral t-distribution.

Implementations 
The noncentral F-distribution is implemented in the R language (e.g., pf function), in MATLAB (ncfcdf, ncfinv, ncfpdf, ncfrnd and ncfstat functions in the statistics toolbox) in Mathematica (NoncentralFRatioDistribution function), in NumPy (random.noncentral_f), and in Boost C++ Libraries.

A collaborative wiki page implements an interactive online calculator, programmed in the R language, for the noncentral t, chi-squared, and F distributions, at the Institute of Statistics and Econometrics, School of Business and Economics, Humboldt-Universität zu Berlin.

Notes

References 
 

Continuous distributions
F